Evarcha ignea is a jumping spider species in the genus Evarcha that lives in Nigeria, South Africa and Zimbabwe. The male was first described in 2008 and the female in 2013.

References

Salticidae
Fauna of Nigeria
Arthropods of Zimbabwe
Spiders of South Africa
Spiders of Africa
Spiders described in 2008
Taxa named by Wanda Wesołowska